Niabella aurantiaca is a Gram-negative, strictly aerobic and non-spore-forming bacterium from the genus of Niabella which has been isolated from greenhouse soil from Yeoju inn Korea.

References

Chitinophagia
Bacteria described in 2007